Frattesina is a place in northern Italy near the town of Fratta Polesine which, in the Late Bronze Age, was responsible for the production of much of the glass found in Europe.

Frattesina was founded on the river Po, and evidence of glass manufacture dates from ca. 1100 to the tenth century BC. Evidence suggests that not only was alkali glass manufactured there, but also that the site was involved in long-distance trade. Evidence of glazing of pottery has also been found.

References

Archaeological sites in Veneto